Badminton at the 1993 Southeast Asian Games was held at Singapore Badminton Hall, Singapore. Indonesians dominated by winning six out of seven gold medals while Malaysia won a single gold in the men's doubles discipline.

Medal summary

Medal table

Medalists

Results

Men's singles

Women's singles

Men's doubles

Women's doubles

Mixed doubles

References 
 

Badminton at the Southeast Asian Games
Badminton tournaments in Singapore
1993 in badminton
1993 in Singaporean sport
Sport in Singapore
1993 Southeast Asian Games